The striped robber (Brycinus lateralis) is a species of fish in the  family Alestidae. It is found in Angola, Botswana, Malawi, Mozambique, Namibia, South Africa, Zambia, and Zimbabwe. Its natural habitats are rivers and inland deltas.

References

Brycinus
Taxa named by George Albert Boulenger
Fish described in 1900
Taxonomy articles created by Polbot